Group B of the 2000 Rugby League World Cup is one of the four groups in the 2000 Rugby League World Cup.

Standings

Matches

New Zealand vs Lebanon 

New Zealand:1. Richie Barnett (c), 2. Leslie Vainikolo, 3. Tonie Carroll, 4. Willie Talau, 5. Brian Jellick, 6. Henry Paul, 7. Stacey Jones8. Smith, 9. Swain, 10. Pongia, 11. Logan Swann, 12. Kearney, 13. Ruben Wiki.Substitutes: Joe Vagana, Robbie Paul, Rua, Cayless.Coach:Frank Endacott

Lebanon:1. Hazem El Masri (c), 2. Najarrin, 3. Katrib, 4. Touma, 5. H. Saleh, 6. Stanton, 7. Coorey8. Maroon, 9. Semrani, 10. Elamad, 11. Chamoun, 12. Khoury, 13. Lichaa.Substitutes: Salem, Nohra, Tamer, S. El Masri.

Wales vs Cook Islands 

Wales:1. Paul Atcheson, 2. Paul Sterling, 3. Jason Critchley, 4. Kris Tassell, 5. Anthony Sullivan, 6. Iestyn Harris (c), 7. Lee Briers8. Anthony Farrell, 9. Keiron Cunningham, 10. Dave Whittle, 11. Justin Morgan, 12. Mick Jenkins, 13. Dean Busby.Substitutes: Ian Watson, Wes Davies, Paul Highton, Garreth Carvell.

Cook Islands:1. Richard Piakura, 2. Tongia, 3. Steve Berryman, 4. Kevin Iro (c), 5. Karl Temata, 6. Bowen, 7. Joe8. Tuakuru, 9. Clark, 10. Temu, 11. Kuru, 12. Pau, 13. Anthony Samuel.Substitutes: Andersson, Lewis, Tere Glassie, Cook.

New Zealand vs Cook Islands

Wales vs Lebanon

Cook Islands vs Lebanon

Wales vs New Zealand

References

External links 
 Rugby League Project

2000 Rugby League World Cup